NTV Tarih was a weekly Turkish history magazine owned by Doğuş Media Group. It was established in February 2009. It was closed down in mid-2013 by its owner in response to the magazine's coverage of the 2013 protests in Turkey, with Doğuş refusing to distribute the final edition. The magazine's staff published the edition online and sought to continue the magazine independently.

References

2009 establishments in Turkey
2013 disestablishments in Turkey
Censorship in Turkey
Defunct magazines published in Turkey
History magazines
Magazines established in 2009
Magazines disestablished in 2013
Monthly magazines published in Turkey
Magazines published in Istanbul
Turkish-language magazines
Doğuş Group